Johnson's Chapel AME Church is a historic church on E. High Street in Springfield, Kentucky. It was built in 1872 and added to the National Register in 1989.

It was built by church member and builder Wilse McElroy.  The church congregation was formed before the Civil War.  The site was deemed significant "as an important example of late 19th c. Gothic architecture" and "as an important local black history site with important associations."

The church building appears no longer to exist.  The First Baptist Church of Springfield occupies its site.

References

African Methodist Episcopal churches in Kentucky
Churches on the National Register of Historic Places in Kentucky
Gothic Revival church buildings in Kentucky
Churches completed in 1872
Churches in Springfield, Kentucky
National Register of Historic Places in Washington County, Kentucky
1872 establishments in Kentucky